The SAGE radar stations of Air Defense Command (Aerospace Defense Command after 1968) were the military installations operated by USAF squadrons using the 1st automated air defense environment (Semi-Automatic Ground Environment) and networked by the SAGE System, a computer network.  Most of the radar stations used the Burroughs AN/FST-2 Coordinate Data Transmitting Set (CDTS) to automate the operator environment and provide radar tracks to sector command posts at SAGE Direction Centers (DCs), e.g., the Malmstrom Z-124 radar station was co-located with DC-20.  The sector/division radar stations were networked by DCs and Manual Control Centers to provide command, control, and coordination (e.g., at Topsham AFS for the "Bangor North American Air Defense Sector") for ground-controlled interception of enemy aircraft by interceptors such as the F-106 developed to work with the SAGE System.

Background
Post-World War II radar stations included those of the 1948 "five-station radar net" and the Lashup network completed in 1950, followed by the "Priority Permanent System" with the initial (priority) radar stations completed in 1952 as a "manual air defense system" with Manual ADCCs (e.g., using Plexiglas plotting boards as at the 1954 Ent Air Force Base command center for ADC.)  Several Lashup stations became permanent stations (Camp Hero L-10 became LP-45, Fort Custis L-15/LP-56/P-56, Palermo L-13/LP-54, Sault Sainte Marie L-17/LP-20, Highlands L-12/LP-9) and in 1951 some new Permanent System stations similarly designated LP-2, LP-16, etc., instead of using newly deployed radars, were outfitted with older radars such as the January 1945 GE AN/CPS-5 radar, 1948 Western Electric AN/TPS-1B Radar, Bendix AN/TPS-1C radar.  The MX-1353 and other programs developed the AN/FPS-6, AN/MPS-10, and other Cold War radars

"At the end of 1957, ADC operated 182 radar stations…32 had been added during the last half of the year as low-altitude, unmanned gap-filler radars.  The total consisted of 47 gap-filler stations, 75 Permanent System radars, 39 semimobile radars, 19 Pinetree stations,…1 Lashup[-era radar and a] single Texas Tower".  SAGE System groundbreaking was at McChord Air Force Base for DC-12 in 1957 where the "electronic brain" began arriving in November 1958 for the Seattle Air Defense Sector, and the post-war Ground Observation Corps was disbanded in 1959.

Description
Also part of the SAGE Air Defense System were radar stations in sectors with Manual Control Centers which provided radar tracks by voice communication, and 4th floor consoles of SAGE Direction Centers in adjacent sectors could input those stations' tracks in the "Manual Inputs" room adjacent to the "Communication Recording-Monitoring and VHF" room. Squadrons at some radar stations were the parent organizations for detachments at other stations, e.g., the 666th RADSQ at Mill Valley Z-38 was the parent of Detachment 2 at the Mather AFB radar station, and the 771st RADSQ at Cape Charles Z-56 was responsible for 3 gap-filler annexes in Delaware, Virginia, and North Carolina.

Most radar stations were part of the preceding Permanent System and some SAGE stations had Ground Air Transmit Receive (GATR) equipment for radioing command guidance by TDDL automated data link to autopilots of equipped interceptors for vectoring to targets (e.g., GATR site R-28 was at Palermo Z-54.)   In addition to a squadron operations building (e.g., with CDTS), structures at the radar station included the radar pedestals (e.g., some CONUS stations such as Fort Heath used Arctic Towers), a squadron headquarters building, electrical generator and fuel storage structures, etc.

Notable remaining structures of SAGE radar stations include the radar tower at the Selfridge Military Air Museum, the Walker AFS quonset hut next to the Arctic Tower, the former SAGE barracks used for the McChord AFB museum, and the antenna tower, building, and Cold War era radar equipment which have survived nearly completely intact at the Saugatuck gap filler annex.

SAGE upgrades
Air Defense Command radar squadrons were renamed as personnel were assigned with training for the automated CDTS, e.g., the "609th Radar Squadron (SAGE)" was designated on September 1, 1958 (originally an AC&W Sq).  The Air Defense Command reorganization when the SAGE System was deployed included the redesignation of Air Divisions to Air Defense Sectors in 1959, e.g., the 27th Air Division was renamed between February 1, 1959 and April 1, 1966, as the Los Angeles Air Defense Sector (LAADS) followed by the inactivation of units such as the Air Defense Forces (Western, Central, & Eastern, on July 1, 1960) and some Numbered Air Forces (e.g., Fourth Air Force, September 1, 1960).  Radar station tracks were used for 1958 CIM-10 "BOMARC test firings at Patrick, Gunter, and McGuire", and a SAGE Radar Station was used for the 1st Bomarc intercept of a Cape Canaveral drone on August 7, 1958.  A few SAGE radar stations provided radar tracks for use with the 8 operational Bomarc complexes, e.g., for 28 Upper Peninsula launch shelters ("Kincheloe AFB BOMARC site"), 56 shelters in New Jersey (operational September 1, 1959), and 56 Long Island shelters (SAGE codename "BED") near the "FOX" mainland site.

Of the 8 Permanent System stations that closed from 1959 to 1964 with squadrons relocating to stations with "RP" designations, 2 were the last remaining stations with the "LP" designation: (Elkhorn LP-31/RP-31F and Blue Knob LP-63).  From 1959 to 1962, three NORAD radar stations were added for the SAGE Radar Network (i.e., after the 3rd semi-mobile phase of the Permanent System): Key West Z-209, Richmond Z-210, Patrick Z-211 in 1962.  One SAGE radar station also provided gap-filler radar coverage for Nike Hercules: San Pedro Hill Z-39 (RP-39) for the 1963–74 Integrated Fire Control area of Malibu Nike battery LA-78 on San Vicente Mtn.

A few Permanent System stations continued operations without being redesignated with Z-xx "NORAD identification codes", e.g., 1952 Duncanville P-79 until 1964, 1958 Cottonwood SM-150 until 1965, and 1948 Hamilton P-48 until 1973.    In 1963 when NORAD/ADC command operations moved from Ent AFB to the nearby Chidlaw Building's Combined Operations Center with SAGE-automation, on July 31 the SAGE radar stations were redesignated with the Z-xx codes. Some sector assignments were redesignated (e.g., Watertown AFS was assigned from the 1958 Syracuse Air Defense Sector to the Boston Air Defense Sector on September 4, 1963) and by the end of 1963 nearly all of the Permanent System radar stations not used for SAGE had closed.  In 1966, Chidlaw Building operations transferred to the Cheyenne Mountain nuclear bunker, SAGE's 1st BUIC II II CCCS was deployed (North Truro Z-10), and NORAD/ADC reorganized the Air Defense Sectors back to Air Divisions.

JUSS radar stations
The joint-use site system (JUSS) was completed after the 1959 Missile Master Plan resolved the surface-to-air missile dispute: both the US Army & USAF SAMs would be deployed and their computers were integrated with each CCCS netting the USAF sector or Army region radar stations. The SAGE System used crosstelling of "SAGE reference track data" from the BOMARC AN/FSQ-7 to the NIKE Hercules AN/FSG-1's "two surveillance and entry consoles", and the 9 bunker sites had been selected by June 1957 for coordinating Army batteries' intercept of targets within an interior NIKE Defense Area of the USAF sector. Deployment of JUSS resulted in several "LP" Permanent System stations closing, and the squadrons relocated to new JUSS "RP" radar stations at most of the 9 sites where Army Missile Master bunkers were being constructed through December 14, 1960. Construction of the Highlands Army Air Defense Site for NY-55DC (4th Q-7) began adjacent to the 1948 Highlands P-9 to use the existing equipment as "Missile Master organic radars" and in 1961, the 770th Radar Squadron at Palermo LP-54 moved to the existing Ft Meade Nike AADCP (W-13DC with USAF RP-54 designation). As at San Pedro Hill (ARSR-tbd), the JUSS radar station at Fort Heath B-21DC (the 3rd FSG-1 & 2nd bunker completed-- 1960) also had a 1959 ARSR-1 radar of the FAA in addition to 2 USAF and 2 Army height finder radars.

Locations

Codes for Aerospace Defense Command radar stations in the United States                                                                             

 LP-xx designates Permanent System stations using older radar equipment instead of radars deployed at "P-xx" stations
 P-xx designates "Priority Permanent System" stations completed by May 1952
 RP-xx designates a replacement of one of the permanent stations
 M-xx designates an initial a station of the 1953-7 semi-mobile radar program
 SM-xx designates a station of the 1954–62 "second phase mobile radar program"
 TM-xx designates a station of the 1957–60 "third phase mobile radar program"
 TT-x designates the Texas Towers, radar tower rigs off the East Coast.
 Z-xx is the NORAD identification code

Codes for Aerospace Defense Command radar stations outside the United States
 C-xx sites on the Canadian Pinetree Line assigned to ADC
 G-xx sites in Greenland established by Northeast Air Command (NEAC) reassigned to ADC, redesignated as C-xx sites.
 H-xx sites in Iceland established by Military Air Transport Service or NEAC reassigned to ADC.
 N-xx Pinetree Line sites in Canada transferred from NEAC to ADC in 1957, redesignated as C-xx sites.

Replacement
Many of the SAGE radar stations, particularly the locations with Air Route Surveillance Radars (e.g., San Pedro Hill Z-39) were retained when the SAGE System was replaced by the Joint Surveillance System for which the USAF declared full operational capability of the 1st 7 Regional Operational Control Centers (ROCCs) on December 23, 1980 (the NORAD Command Center was also upgraded).  SAGE radar stations discontinued in 1980 included Almaden (activated 1957), Cambria (1951). Dauphin Island (1959), MacDill (1954), Mill Valley (1951), North Bend (1951), and North Charleston (1955); and stations eventually transferring to the Federal Aviation Administration included Mill Valley Air Force Station.

See also
 Permanent System radar stations
 Joint Surveillance System

References

Radar stations of the United States Air Force
Lists of Cold War sites
Air defence radar networks